Manford 'Manny' J. Steele (born February 6, 1940) is an American politician and a Republican member of the South Dakota House of Representatives representing District 12 since January 2007.

Education
Steele earned his BA in business administration from Bellevue University.

Elections
2012 Steele and Representative Hal Wick were unopposed for the June 5, 2012 Republican Primary; in the four-way November 6, 2012 General election Representative Wick took the first seat and Steele took the second seat with 5,029 votes (26.9%) ahead of Democratic nominees Susan Randall and Mike Knudson.
2006 With Representative Murschel leaving the Legislature and leaving a District 12 seat open, Wick ran in the four-way June 6, 2006 Republican Primary and placed second by 10 votes with 689 votes (27.3%); in the five-way November 7, 2006 General election incumbent Republican Representative Hal Wick took the first seat and Steele took the second seat with 4,480 votes (25.6%) ahead of Democratic nominees Joe Weis, Gregory Kniffen, and Libertarian candidate John Anderson.
2008 With incumbent Republican Representative Wick running for South Dakota Senate and leaving a District 12 seat open, Steele ran in the four-way June 3, 2008 Republican Primary and placed first with 1,172 votes (38.8%); in the four-way November 4, 2008 General election Steele took the first seat with 6,638 votes (29.42%) and fellow Republican nominee Blake Curd took the second seat ahead of Democratic nominees Paula Johnson and returning 2006 opponent Gregory Kniffen.
2010 When incumbent Representative Curd left the Legislature and left a District 12 seat open, Steele ran in the three-way June 8, 2010 Republican Primary and placed second with 1,531 votes (38.2%) and former Representative Casey Murschel placed third; in the four-way November 2, 2010 General election former Representative Hal Wick took the first seat Steele took the second seat with 5,980 votes (30.93%) ahead of Democratic nominees Paula Johnson and Joel Fagerhaug.

References

External links
Official page at the South Dakota Legislature
 

1940 births
Living people
Bellevue University alumni
Republican Party members of the South Dakota House of Representatives
Politicians from Sioux Falls, South Dakota
People from Stearns County, Minnesota
United States Navy sailors
21st-century American politicians